Brachodes laeta is a moth of the family Brachodidae. It is found in France and Spain.

The wingspan is 22–28 mm. The wings of the males are straw yellow, while females have a dark ground colour with yellow markings.

References

Moths described in 1863
Brachodidae
Moths of Europe